William Peter Knipper Was born (9 August 1882 in Rochester, New York and died  7 September 1968 in Rochester, New York) was an American race car driver.

Biography
He was born on August 9, 1882 in Rochester, New York. the son of William Peter and Mary E. Nura Knipper  he married Mae Christine Ottman 06 Nov 1913 in  Rochester, New York

A hillclimb was held at West Dugway Hill, Penfield, New York, on October 13, 1906. The free-for-all class was won by Billy Knipper (Thomas 60-h.p.) in a time of 51.8 sec.

At the time of his marriage in 1913 he was employed as an Engraver.

And was an Automobile Dealership owner in Rochester, New York

He died on September 7, 1968 in Rochester, New York.

Indy 500 results

References 

1882 births
1968 deaths
Indianapolis 500 drivers
Sportspeople from Rochester, New York
Racing drivers from New York (state)